RMS Aurania can refer to any of three ships originally owned and operated by the Cunard Line:

 , built in 1882, scrapped in 1905
 , built in 1916, converted for use as a troopship and torpedoed by a German U-boat in 1918
 , built in 1924, converted for use as an armed merchant cruiser in 1939, finally scrapped in 1961

Ship names